National road 36 (Polish: Droga krajowa nr 36) is an about 150 km long G class and GP class national road connecting Prochowice in Lower Silesian Voivodeship with Ostrów Wielkopolski in Greater Poland Voivodeship.

References 

36